Dan Falk (born 1966) is a Canadian science journalist, broadcaster, and author.  He has written for The Globe and Mail, the Toronto Star, The Walrus, Cottage Life, SkyNews, Astronomy and New Scientist, and has contributed to the CBC radio programs Ideas, Quirks and Quarks, Tapestry and Spark.

He has published three books:
The Universe on a T-Shirt: The Quest for the Theory of Everything
In Search of Time: Journeys Along a Curious Dimension.  
The Science of Shakespeare.

Universe on a T-Shirt was the winner of the 2002 Science in Society Journalism Award from the Canadian Science Writers’ Association, as well as the John and Margaret Savage First Book Award, part of the Atlantic Book Awards. In 2015, Falk was the winner of the Science in Society Journalism Award for his article Getting Smarter, published in the University of Toronto Magazine. In 2019, Falk was the winner of the Sandford Fleming Medal for Excellence in Science Communication, awarded by the Royal Canadian Institute for Science.

Dan co-hosts the podcast, BookLab, with Amanda Gefter which reviews popular science books and explores the topics raised by the authors.

Education
Mr Falk graduated from the University of Toronto with an MA in the history and philosophy of science in 2014.  For the academic year 2011–2012 he was a Knight Science Journalism Fellow at MIT. He also graduated from Ryerson University with a BAA Journalism in 1992 and received a BSC (physics) from Dalhousie University in Halifax, Nova Scotia.

Bibliography

Books

Articles

References

Canadian male journalists
Canadian male non-fiction writers
Canadian science writers
Journalists from Nova Scotia
Smithsonian (magazine) people
1966 births
Living people